<noinclude>
Drop shipping is a form of retail business where the seller accepts customer orders without keeping stock on hand. Instead, in a form of supply chain management, the seller transfers the orders and their shipment details either to the manufacturer, a wholesaler, another retailer, or a fulfillment house, which then ships the goods directly to the customer. The seller is responsible for marketing and selling the product, but has little or no control over product quality, storage, inventory management, or shipping. By doing this, it eliminates the costs of maintaining warehouses – or even a storefront –    purchasing and storing inventory, and employing necessary staff for such functions. As in any other form of retail, the seller makes profit on the difference between an item's wholesale and retail price, less any pertinent selling, merchant, or shipping fees accruing against them.

Procedure
A drop shipping business to consumer model does not require a brick and mortar store.  It may be eliminated entirely, or combined with drop shipped order fulfillment business model. A physical retailer may keep potential drop shipped items on display, provide details on mail order items via a catalogue, or maintain a website with information available only online.  A virtual retailer only has a website.

Drop shipping retailers are not required to disclose the practice, nor, as with any other retailer, the wholesale source of the products they offer. This can be achieved by "blind shipping" (shipping merchandise without a return address corresponding to the seller), "private label shipping" (having merchandise shipped from the wholesaler with a return address customised to the retailer), or utilising a fulfillment house.  The ultimate order fulfiller might also include a customised packing slip, including details such as the retailer's company name, logo, and contact information.

In unusual circumstances drop shipping can occur when a small retailer (that typically sells in small quantities to the general public) receives a single large order for a product. The retailer may arrange for the goods to be shipped directly to the customer from the manufacturer or distributor.

Sellers on online auction sites such as eBay also use drop shipping as way of distributing products without stocking the items sold. A seller will list an item as new, and have purchased items shipped directly from the wholesaler to the customer. The seller's profit is the difference between the selling and the wholesale prices, minus any pertinent selling, merchant, or shipping fees accruing to them. However, some of the drop shipping methods used by sellers are not allowed under the eBay terms of service. This includes drop shipping methods in which a seller fulfills an order by purchasing the item from another online marketplace and having the item shipped to the customer. Sellers who use this method can be suspended from eBay.

Products may be listed by a drop shipping retailer as available but actually be back-ordered either with the wholesaler or the item's manufacturer.  Such potential delays in order fulfilment are not always known, or even when known disclosed, by a seller.  They also can be extended, beyond the control of the seller.  Likewise order fulfilment and shipping delays are beyond the seller's control, yet can reflect badly on the purchaser's ultimate satisfaction with their transaction.  This puts a premium on timely and accurate information provision by the seller on both sides of the purchase, both before and after it is made.

In China
The use of Chinese drop shipping companies has been on the rise in recent years by both companies and individuals. This is largely due to the increasing ease of e-procurement and the growing part that the internet is playing in commerce. Drop ship suppliers based in China have increasingly been able to compete with same-country distributors because of improved logistics for small packets and the easing of trade barriers.

Scams 
Drop shipping has also been a component of internet-based work-at-home schemes posted on social networking services. Scam artists will promote drop-shipping as a work-at-home scheme, in which victims will be sold a list of businesses from which drop shipment orders can be placed. These businesses may not be wholesalers, but other businesses or individuals acting as middlemen between retailers and wholesalers, with no product of their own to sell. These middlemen often charge prices that leave little profit margin for the victim and require a regular fee for use of their services. In 2019, the Gimlet Media podcast Reply All investigated the drop-shipping phenomenon, exploring the way drop shippers microtarget their client, but also found that micro-shipping itself is a rather dubious industry in that, despite the promises of some of the most well-known drop-shipping proponents, few drop shippers actually make any profits.

In 2016, Buzzfeed News published an article exposing unscrupulous drop-shippers in China, describing how customers were receiving products that were not as those were advertised, or not receiving any products at all.

One effect of drop-shipping is that customers who receive a drop-shipped package will realise that they overpaid for the item, return the item to the seller, then reorder the identical item directly from the manufacturer. The cost of processing the return and the loss of the unsalable returned product can result in significant losses to the drop shipper.

See also 
 Fulfillment house
 Logistics
 Mail forwarding
 Mail order
 Order fulfillment
 Will call

References 

Retail processes and techniques
Supply chain management